Kevin Healey is an American soccer coach who took the Baltimore Bays to three USISL indoor championships.

Healey grew up in Dundalk, Maryland and graduated from Calvert Hall College High School.  He attended Loyola University Maryland, playing on the school’s 1976 NCAA Division II Men's Soccer Championship team.  After graduation, Healey entered the banking industry, eventually becoming the vice president of Provident Bank of Maryland.  He also coached youth soccer with Dundalk Post 38.  In 1986, Healey took the Dundalk Post 38 U-19 team to the regional championship.  In 1990, he founded the Soccer Club of Baltimore.  In March 1991, he coached the Baltimore Hummers to a national open indoor championship.  In January 1993, the newly established Baltimore Bays of the USISL hired Healey for its upcoming outdoor season.  Over the next five years, Healey coached the Bays to three indoor championships (1996-1998) and was a three time Coach of the Year.  In 1998, the Baltimore Blast of the National Professional Soccer League hired Healey as both head coach and general manager.  Healey coached the Blast until 2002 compiling an 85-83 record.  Healey continues to serve as general manager of the Blast.  In 2007, the Maryland Soccer Hall of Fame inducted Healey.  In addition to his duties with the Blast, Healey also serves as president and coach of the Baltimore Bays youth club.  The Bays were founded in 2002 as a merger of the Soccer Club of Baltimore, founded by Healey, and the Baltimore Football Club.

Healey is the son of Francis Patrick Healey, a former professional player, coach and administrator who is a member of the Maryland Soccer Hall of Fame.  His son Pat Healey plays professionally.

References

External links
 Baltimore Blast: Kevin Healey

Living people
American soccer players
American soccer coaches
Association football executives
Loyola Greyhounds men's soccer players
Major Indoor Soccer League (2001–2008) coaches
National Professional Soccer League (1984–2001) coaches
USISL coaches
People from Dundalk, Maryland
Association footballers not categorized by position
Year of birth missing (living people)